Cheng Chih-lung may refer to:

 Cheng Chih-lung (basketball) (born 1969), a Taiwanese basketball player/coach and politician
 Zheng Zhilong (1604–1661), a pirate and warlord during the Ming and Qing dynasties